Naiads is a 1984 fountain and sculpture by Jack Greaves, installed by the Capitol Square skyscraper in Columbus, Ohio.

Description and history
The bronze sculpture depicts two nude women with nine birds flying above. They rest on a base depicting swimming salmon and sunfish. Naiads was surveyed by the Smithsonian Institution's "Save Outdoor Sculpture!" program in 1994.

See also
 1984 in art

References

1984 establishments in Ohio
1984 sculptures
Bronze sculptures in Ohio
Downtown Columbus, Ohio
Fish in art
Fountains in Ohio
Outdoor sculptures in Columbus, Ohio
Naiads
Nude sculptures in the United States
Sculptures of birds in the United States
Sculptures of women in Ohio
Statues in Columbus, Ohio